Orphans of the Storm is a 1921 American silent drama film by D. W. Griffith set in late-18th-century France, before and during the French Revolution.

The last Griffith film to feature both Lillian and Dorothy Gish, it was a commercial failure, following box-office hits such as The Birth of a Nation and Broken Blossoms.

Like his earlier films, Griffith used historical events to comment on contemporary events, in this case the French Revolution to warn about the rise of Bolshevism. The film is about class conflict and a plea for inter-class understanding and against destructive hatred. At one point, in front of the Committee of Public Safety, a main character pleads, "Yes I am an aristocrat, but a friend of the people."

The film is based on the 1874 French play Les Deux Orphelines by Adolphe d'Ennery and Eugène Cormon.

Plot

Just before the French Revolution, Henriette takes her close adopted sister Louise to Paris in the hope of finding a cure for her blindness. She promises Louise that she will not marry until Louise can look upon her husband to approve him. Lustful aristocrat de Praille (whose carriage kills a child, enraging peasant father, Forget-not) meets the two outside Paris. Taken by the virginal Henriette's beauty, he has her abducted and brought to his estate where a lavish party is being held, leaving Louise helpless in the big city. An honorable aristocrat, the Chevalier de Vaudrey helps Henriette to escape de Praille and his guests by successfully fighting a duel with him. The scoundrel Mother Frochard, seeing an opportunity to make money, tricks Louise into her underground house to be kept prisoner. Unable to find Louise with the help of the Chevalier, Henriette rents a room, but before leaving her de Vaudrey comforts and kisses the distressed woman. Later, Henriette gives shelter to admirable politician Danton, who after an attack by Royalist spies following a public speech falls for her. As a result, she runs foul of the radical revolutionary Robespierre, a friend of Danton.

Mother Frochard forces Louise into begging. Meanwhile, de Vaudrey proposes to Henriette and she refuses. After expressing love for each other, he promises Henriette that Louise will be found. King Louis XVI orders Henriette to be arrested, due to his disapproval of de Vaudrey's choice of wife, and the Chevalier is also sent away while his aunt visits Henriette. During the meeting, Louise is heard singing outside, where Frochard has told her to walk blindly and sing. Henriette calls out from her upstairs balcony, but the panicked Louise is dragged off by Frochard and Henriette is arrested and sent to a women's prison.

Louise and Frochard's begging continues with the other two Frochards, and before long the Revolution begins. A battle between the Royalist soldiers and the people allied with the police, who are successful, results in aristocrats being killed and the prisoners of the "Tyrants" (including Henriette) being freed. A people's 'rag-tag' government is formed, and Forget-not takes his revenge against de Praille.

Robespierre and Forget-not send Henriette and her lover, the Chevalier de Vaudrey, to the guillotine, for hiding de Vaudrey, an aristocrat, who returned to Paris to find her. However, Danton manages to obtain a pardon for them. After a race through the streets of Paris he just manages to save Henriette and offers her to the Chevalier, when the two orphans unite. A doctor restores Louise's sight, she approves marriage between Henriette and the Chevalier, and a better-organized Republic forms in France.

Visual effects

The movie uses several visual effects throughout to capture the emotion of its story, using monochromic filters of red, blue, green, yellow and sepia to show feeling with the silent action which is accompanied by music; the movie also uses fade-ins to achieve this effect.

Background
The film is based on the 1874 French play Les Deux Orphelines by Adolphe d'Ennery and Eugène Cormon, which had been adapted for the American stage by N. Hart Jackson and Albert Marshman Palmer as The Two Orphans, premiering at Marshman Palmer's Union Square Theatre (58 E. 14th St.) in New York City in December 1874 with Kate Claxton as Louise. It had been filmed in the United States twice before Griffith did his film: in 1911 by Otis Turner and in 1915 by Herbert Brenon (the lost Theda Bara film The Two Orphans). The play had also been filmed twice in France in 1910: by Albert Capellani and by Georges Monca.

The Two Orphans, the English-language version of the play upon which the movie is based, had been a staple of the actress Kate Claxton. After the premiere at the original Union Square Theatre in 1874, she had performed it hundreds of times for various theatrical companies in New York, including the Brooklyn Theater (she was performing it there on the night of the infamous Brooklyn Theater Fire in 1876), and she had eventually acquired the US rights to the play.

In securing the film rights, Griffith had to wrangle with Miss Claxton, who for unknown reasons seems to have been reluctant to allow the story to be filmed a third time. When Griffith completed his film for release, a rival German version of the story had been made (Claxton owned foreign film rights as well) and was being prepared for release in the US at the same time as Griffith's version. Griffith bought out the US distribution rights to the German version so that it could not conflict with the earning potential of his own film.

Release
The film was originally released on 14 reels, although a 12-reel abridged version was made available to theaters a few months later.

Despite Griffith's reputation at the box office, the film was not a financial success.

Critical reception
The New York Times wrote: "As the vivid scenes of the historically colored melodrama flashed one after another on the screen everyone surely felt that Griffith was himself again" but added "The seasoned spectator, no matter how he may let himself go, knows that every delay is a device to heighten the suspense and every advantage given the rescuers is calculated to evoke his cheers (...) whatever he does, he is not surprised when the girl is saved".

In a retrospective review, Pauline Kael described it as an epic spectacle, "a marvellous, expensively produced mixture of melodrama and sentimentality, with duels, kidnappings, the storming of the Bastille, and Lillian Gish being saved from the guillotine." She made the assessment that it was "not one of Griffith's greatest", but it nonetheless contains memorable sequences of "theatrical sublimity".

In popular culture
In Spike Jones' skit "The Late Late Late Movies" (Mercury F-55191), "Billy Playtex" announces that night's feature as "'Orphans of the Storm'", starring the Gish Sisters! And introducing, Elmo Lincoln!" (Actually, Lincoln did not appear in this film.) This is a parody of the fact many stations would air very old movies (even forty-year-old silent pictures), as the movie studios forbade TV from playing first-run features at the time the record was made in 1960.

Main cast

 Lillian Gish as Henriette Girard
 Dorothy Gish as Louise
 Joseph Schildkraut as Chevalier de Vaudrey
 Frank Losee as Count de Linières
 Catherine Emmet as Countess de Linières
 Morgan Wallace as Marquis de Praille
 Lucille La Verne as Mother Frochard
 Frank Puglia as Pierre Frochard
 Sheldon Lewis as Jacques Frochard
 Creighton Hale as Picard
 Leslie King as Jacques-Forget-Not
 Monte Blue as Danton
 Sidney Herbert as Robespierre
 Lee Kohlmar as Louis XVI
 Marcia Harris as Henriette's Landlady
 Adolph Lestina as Doctor
 Kate Bruce as Sister Genevieve
 Flora Finch as Starving Peasant
 Louis Wolheim as Executioner
 Kenny Delmar as The Chevalier, as a boy	
 Fay Marbe as Dancer

References

 Stanley Appelbaum, Great Actors and Actresses of the American Stage in Historic Photographs: 332 Portraits From 1850-1950 (1983)

External links 

 
 
 
 
 Orphans of the Storm at Virtual History

1921 films
1920s historical drama films
American historical drama films
American silent feature films
American black-and-white films
American films based on plays
Remakes of American films
American remakes of French films
French Revolution films
Films about capital punishment
Films about orphans
Films set in Paris
United Artists films
Films directed by D. W. Griffith
Articles containing video clips
Cultural depictions of Maximilien Robespierre
Cultural depictions of Louis XVI
Cultural depictions of Georges Danton
1921 drama films
1920s American films
Silent American drama films
Films about disability
1920s English-language films